The Copa dos Campeões Mundiais, was a tournament organized by the Brazilian television network Sistema Brasileiro de Televisão (SBT) with the consent of CBF featuring Brazilian clubs that were previously successful in the conquest of the Intercontinental Cup. The competition was inspired by the same precedents that CONMEBOL used for the Supercopa Libertadores, which contained champions from past editions of the Copa Libertadores.

Despite being considered a friendly tournament, their matches were officially assigned to the CBF calendar for the three years in which the tournament was held.

Eligible clubs

Only four clubs had won the Interncontinental Cup until the tournament came into being realized:

Format 

The tournament was played in round-robin in its first stage, followed by a final between the top two clubs. The tournament matches were played mostly in the Brazilian Midwest region, in the cities of Cuiabá, Brasília and Campo Grande. The city of Uberlândia, Minas Gerais, also hosted games in the 1995 edition. 

The tournament was held during the months of June or July.

List of champions

References  

 
Intercontinental Cup (football)
Sistema Brasileiro de Televisão
Recurring sporting events established in 1995
Recurring sporting events disestablished in 1997